Dhaneswarpur is a village, in the Dantan II CD block in the Kharagpur subdivision of the Paschim Medinipur district in the state of West Bengal, India.

Geography

Location

Area overview
Kharagpur subdivision, shown partly in the map alongside, mostly has alluvial soils, except in two CD blocks in the west – Kharagpur I and Keshiary, which mostly have lateritic soils. Around 74% of the total cultivated area is cropped more than once. With a density of population of 787 per km2 nearly half of the district's population resides in this subdivision. 14.33% of the population lives in urban areas and 86.67% lives in the rural areas.

Note: The map alongside presents some of the notable locations in the subdivision. All places marked in the map are linked in the larger full screen map.

Demographics
As per 2011 Census of India Dhaneswarpur had a total population of 2,000 of which 1,020 (51%) were males and 98 (49%) were females. Population below 6 years was 199. The total number of literates in Dhaneswarpur was 1,341 (67.05% of the population over 6 years).

Civic administration

CD block HQ
The headquarters of Dantan II CD block are located at Dhaneswarpur.

Transport
SH 5 connecting Rupnarayanpur (in Bardhaman district) and Junput (in Purba Medinipur district) passes through Dhaneswarpur.

References

Villages in Paschim Medinipur district